Saga 1st district is a constituency of the House of Representatives in the Diet of Japan (national legislature). It is located in Saga Prefecture and consists of Tosu, parts of Saga and Kanzaki as well as the Miyaki District. As of September 2012, 237,748 eligible voters were registered in the district.

Saga 1st district has been a swing district since its creation in 1996: it alternately elected candidates for the Liberal Democratic Party (LDP) and the Democratic Party of Japan (DPJ)/its precursor New Frontier Party (NFP). The district is currently represented by Kazuchika Iwata (LDP), a former second-generation Saga prefectural assemblyman. In 2012, Iwata defeated Kazuhiro Haraguchi (DPJ), Minister of Internal Affairs and Communication in the Hatoyama cabinet. Haraguchi had initially won the district narrowly for the NFP in 1996 but lost it in 2000 to Takanori Sakai (LDP) who was appointed as Cabinet Office Vice Minister in the 2nd realigned Mori cabinet. In March 2003, Sakai was arrested (and later sentenced to 32 months in prison) for having received illicit corporate donations in violation of the Political Funds Control Law. Takamaro Fukuoka replaced Sakai as LDP candidate for Saga 1 in the 2003 election and lost to Haraguchi. The "postal privatization" election of 2005 gave the LDP a landslide victory, and Fukuoka beat Haraguchi despite the fact that the DPJ's opposition ally, the Social Democratic Party (SDP), unlike in previous elections did not nominate a candidate in Saga 1st district. In the landslide LDP defeat of 2009, Haraguchi won the district for the third time.

Before the 1994 electoral reform, the area had been part of Saga At-large district where five representatives were elected by single non-transferable vote.

List of representatives

Election results

References 

Districts of the House of Representatives (Japan)